Three ships of the United States Navy have borne the name USS Flying Fish, named in honor of the flying fish.

, was a schooner, purchased in 1838 and sold in 1842. She was used in Charles Wilkes exploration of Antarctica
, was a Gato-class submarine, commissioned in 1942 and struck in 1958
, was a Sturgeon-class submarine, commissioned in 1970 and struck in 1996

United States Navy ship names